Exit in Red is a 1996 American thriller drama film directed by Yurek Bogayevicz and starring Mickey Rourke, Annabel Schofield, Carré Otis, and Anthony Michael Hall.

External links 
 
 

1996 films
1996 romantic drama films
American romantic drama films
Films scored by Michał Lorenc
1990s thriller films
1990s English-language films
Films directed by Yurek Bogayevicz
1990s American films